Nanette Schutte (born 6 April 1962) is a Dutch former professional tennis player who was active during the 1980s.

Schutte was junior singles champion of the Netherlands in the age categories Under-12, 14, 16 and 18.

She reached a highest singles ranking of world No. 190 in 1987. During her career, Schutte reached the second round of the singles event in three Grand Slam tournaments. Her best result at a Grand Slam championship was reaching the third round of the doubles event at the 1980 US Open, where she and her teammate Marcella Mesker lost to Candy Reynolds and Paula Smith.

In October 1981, she partnered Marianne van der Torre to win the doubles title at the Kyoto Classic in Japan, defeating Elizabeth Smylie and Kim Steinmetz in the final in straight sets.

Schutte was a member of the Dutch Federation Cup team in 1980, 1985 and 1986 and compiled a 5–3 win–loss record.

WTA career finals

Doubles: 1 (1 title)

References

External links
 
 
 

1962 births
Living people
Dutch female tennis players
Tennis players from Amsterdam